Abdul Jabbar Khan is a Pakistani Politician who has been elected as Nazim of Taluka Latifabad in 2002, in 2008 he was appointed as Advisor to CM Sindh for Cooperative Department and Now a member of the Provincial Assembly of Sindh since August 2018.

Political career

He was elected to the Nazim of Taluka Latifabad in 2002. 

He was Participated in General Election of 2008 and Appointed as Advisor to CM Sindh and Minister for Cooperative Department. 

He was again participated in General Election 2013 from PS-49 Hyderabad but unsuccessful. 

In 2018 He was elected member of Provincial Assembly of Sindh on Pakistan Peoples Party Platform from Constituency PS-64 (Hyderabad-III) in 2018 Pakistani general election.

References

Living people
Pakistan People's Party MPAs (Sindh)
Year of birth missing (living people)